Martin Arnold may refer to:

 Martin Arnold (composer) (born 1959), Canadian composer
 Martin Arnold (filmmaker) (born 1959), Austrian experimental filmmaker
 Martin Arnold (journalist) (1929–2013), American journalist